Stemorrhages amphitritalis is a moth in the family Crambidae. It was described by Achille Guenée in 1854. It is found in Bangladesh, India, Myanmar and from Malaysia to the Solomon Islands. In Australia, it has been recorded from the Northern Territory and Queensland.

References

Moths described in 1854
Spilomelinae